Bielica refers to the following places in Poland:

 Bielica, Warmian-Masurian Voivodeship
 Bielica, West Pomeranian Voivodeship

See also